Seila is a genus of minute sea snails, marine gastropod molluscs or micromolluscs in the family Cerithiopsidae.

Species
According to the World Register of Marine Species (WoRMS), the following species with valid names are included within the genus Seila:

 Seila adamsii (H.C. Lea, 1845)
 Seila africana Bartsch, 1915
 Seila albosutura (Tenison-Woods, 1876)
 Seila alexanderensis Cecalupo & Perugia, 2018
 Seila alfredensis Bartsch, 1915
 Seila angolensis Rolán & Fernandes, 1990
 Seila assimilata (C.B. Adams, 1852)
 † Seila attenuissima P. Marshall & R. Murdoch, 1920
 Seila bandorensis (Melvill, 1893)
 Seila baudisonensis Cecalupo & Perugia, 2018
 Seila capricornia (Laseron, 1956)
 Seila carinata (E.A. Smith, 1871)
 Seila carquejai Rolán & Fernandes, 1990
 Seila chenui Jay & Drivas, 2002
 Seila cincta (Hutton, 1886)
 Seila cingulifera (Thiele, 1930)
 † Seila clifdenensis (Laws, 1941)
 Seila conica Cecalupo & Perugia, 2012
 Seila crocea (Angas, 1871)
 Seila crovatoi Cecalupo & Perugia, 2014
 Seila deaurata Rolán & Fernandes, 1990
 Seila decorata Cecalupo & Perugia, 2012
 Seila dextroversa (Adams & Reeve, 1850 in 1848-50)
 Seila dilecta Marshall, 1978
 Seila elegantissima Marshall, 1978
 Seila exquisita Cecalupo & Perugia, 2012
 † Seila gagei Maxwell, 1992
 Seila gloriosa Cecalupo & Perugia, 2021
 Seila hinduorum (Melvill, 1898)
 Seila incerta Cecalupo & Perugia, 2013
 Seila inchoata Rolán & Fernandes, 1990
 Seila insignis (May, 1911)
 Seila iredalei (Laseron, 1956)
  † Seila kaiparaensis (Laws, 1941)
 Seila kuiperi Rolán & Pelorce, 2006
 Seila laqueata (Gould, 1861)
 Seila lirata Sowerby III, 1897
 Seila mactanensis Cecalupo & Perugia, 2012
 Seila maculosa Laseron, 1951
 Seila magna Laseron, 1951
 Seila maoria Marshall, 1978
 Seila marmorata (Tate, 1893)
 Seila maxima Cecalupo & Perugia, 2014
 Seila montereyensis Bartsch, 1907
 Seila morishimai (Habe, 1970)
 Seila nigrofusca Laseron, 1951
 Seila parilis Rolán & Fernandes, 1990
 † Seila petasa Landau, Ceulemans & Van Dingenen, 2018 
 Seila pulmoensis DuShane & Draper, 1975
 Seila regia Marshall, 1978
 Seila retusa Cecalupo & Perugia, 2014
 Seila samoaensis Cecalupo & Perugia, 2019
 † Seila sancticlementi Marquet, 2001 
 Seila sarinoae Cecalupo & Perugia, 2019
 Seila sienii Cecalupo & Perugia, 2017
 Seila silviae Cecalupo & Perugia, 2012
 Seila slacksmithae Cecalupo & Perugia, 2021
 Seila smithi Bartsch, 1915
 † Seila societatis Cecalupo & Perugia, 2014
 Seila stenopyrgisca Darragh, 2017 
 Seila subalbida Dall, 1927
 Seila tenuis (Laseron, 1951)
 Seila terebelloides (Hutton, 1873)
 Seila tissieri Cecalupo & Perugia, 2020
 Seila trilineata (Philippi, 1836)
 Seila vanuatuensis Cecalupo & Perugia, 2013
 Seila variabilis Cecalupo & Perugia, 2012
 Seila versluysi (Schepman, 1909)
 Seila wadeiensis Cecalupo & Perugia, 2018
 Seila wareni Cecalupo & Perugia, 2012

The Indo-Pacific Molluscan database also includes the following species with names in current use:
 Seila catenaria (Melvill & Standen, 1896)
 Seila cingulata (A. Adams, 1861)
 Seila crassicincta (Yokoyama, 1926)
 Seila parva (Angas, 1877)
 Species brought into synonymy
 Seila attenuata Hedley, 1900: synonym of Seilarex turritelliformis (Angas, 1877)
 Seila bulbosa Suter, 1908: synonym of  † Seila (Hebeseila) bulbosa Suter, 1908
 Seila capitata Thiele, 1925: synonym of Proseila capitata (Thiele, 1925)
 Seila chathamensis Suter, 1908: synonym of Seila (Lyroseila) cinctum (Hutton, 1885)
 Seila cochleata Suter, 1908: synonym of Seila chathamensis Suter, 1908
 Seila dissimilis Suter, 1908: synonym of Specula styliformis (Suter, 1908)
 Seila huttoni Suter, 1915: synonym of Seila chathamensis Suter, 1908
 Seila reunionensis Jay & Drivas, 2002: synonym of Cerithiella reunionensis (Jay & Drivas, 2002)
 Seila terebralis (C. B. Adams, 1840): synonym of Seila adamsii (H.C. Lea, 1845)

References

 Gofas, S.; Afonso, J.P.; Brandào, M. (Ed.). (S.a.). Conchas e Moluscos de Angola = Coquillages et Mollusques d'Angola. [Shells and molluscs of Angola]. Universidade Agostinho / Elf Aquitaine Angola: Angola. 140 pp.
 Gofas, S.; Le Renard, J.; Bouchet, P. (2001). Mollusca, in: Costello, M.J. et al. (Ed.) (2001). European register of marine species: a check-list of the marine species in Europe and a bibliography of guides to their identification. Collection Patrimoines Naturels, 50: pp. 180–213
 Rolán E., 2005. Malacological Fauna From The Cape Verde Archipelago. Part 1, Polyplacophora and Gastropoda.

External links
 Adams, A. (1861). On some new species of Eulima, Leiostraca and Cerithiopsis from Japan. Annals and Magazine of Natural History. (3) 7: 125-131
 Finlay, H. J. (1928). The Recent Mollusca of the Chatham Islands. Transactions of the New Zealand Institute. 59: 232-286. page(s): 243
 Monterosato, T. A. di. (1884). Nomenclatura generica e specifica di alcune conchiglie mediterranee. Virzi, printed for the Author, Palermo, 152 pp.
 Marshall B. (1978). Cerithiopsidae of New Zealand, and a provisional classification of the family. New Zealand Journal of Zoology 5(1): 47-120

Cerithiopsidae